In mechanical engineering, random vibration is motion which is non-deterministic, meaning that future behavior cannot be precisely predicted. The randomness is a characteristic of the excitation or input, not the mode shapes or natural frequencies. Some common examples include an automobile riding on a rough road, wave height on the water, or the load induced on an airplane wing during flight. Structural response to random vibration is usually treated using statistical or probabilistic approaches. Mathematically, random vibration is characterized as an ergodic and stationary process.

A measurement of the acceleration spectral density (ASD) is the usual way to specify random vibration. The root mean square acceleration (Grms) is the square root of the area under the ASD curve in the frequency domain.  The Grms value is typically used to express the overall energy of a particular random vibration event and is a statistical value used in mechanical engineering for structural design and analysis purposes.

While the term power spectral density (PSD) is commonly used to specify a random vibration event, ASD is more appropriate when acceleration is being measured and used in structural analysis and testing.

Crandall is uniformly considered as the father of random vibrations (see also books by Bolotin, Elishakoff et al.). The dramatic effect of often neglected cross-correlations is elucidated in the monograph by Elishakoff.

Random vibration testing 
Test specifications can be established from real environment measurements using an ASD envelope or a fatigue damage equivalence criterion (Extreme response spectrum and Fatigue damage spectrum). Random vibration testing is one of the more common types of vibration testing services performed by vibration test labs.  Some of the more common random vibration test standards are MIL-STD-810, RTCA DO-160, and IEC 60068-2-64.

See also 
 Random noise

References 

 Random Vibrations, Spectral & Wavelet Analysis, D.E. Newland
Mechanical Vibration and Shock Analysis. Volume 3: Random Vibration, Second Edition, ISTE - Wiley, 2009.

External links
 NASA Goddard website about random vibration analysis
 NASA Mars Orbiter website

Mechanical vibrations